The 2017 FIBA U18 European Championship was the 34th edition of the FIBA U18 European Championship. The competition took place in Bratislava and Piešťany, Slovakia, from 29 July to 6 August 2017.

Venues

Participating teams
 

  (Winners, 2016 FIBA U18 European Championship Division B)

 
  (Third place, 2016 FIBA U18 European Championship Division B)

  (Runners-up, 2016 FIBA U18 European Championship Division B)

First round
The first round draw was held on 26 January 2017 in Munich, Germany.
In this round, the 16 teams are allocated in four groups of four teams each. All teams advance to the Second Round of 16.

Group A

Group B

Group C

Group D

Final round

Round of 16 bracket

5th-8th place bracket

9th–16th place bracket

Round of 16

Quarterfinals

Classification 9–16 quarterfinals

Classification 13–16 semifinals

Classification 9–12 semifinals

Classification 5–8 semifinals

Semifinals

15th place game

13th place game

11th place game

9th place game

7th place game

5th place game

Third place game

Final

Final standings

Awards

All-Tournament Team
 PG –  Sani Čampara 
 SG –  Arnas Velička
 SF –  Nikola Mišković (MVP)
 PF –  Sergi Martínez 
 C –  Ragip Berke

References

External links
FIBA official website

FIBA U18 European Championship
Under-18 Championship
Euro
International youth basketball competitions hosted by Slovakia
Sports competitions in Bratislava
July 2017 sports events in Europe
August 2017 sports events in Europe